Ben Chifley Dam, or Chifley Dam, is a rock and earth-fill embankment dam across the Campbells River in the central west region of New South Wales, Australia. The main purpose of the dam is to supply potable water to the city of Bathurst.

The dam is named in honour of Ben Chifley, a former Prime Minister of Australia, Member for Macquarie and resident of Bathurst.

Location and features
Water is released into the Campbells River which flows into the Macquarie River before being captured at the water treatment facility at Gorman's Hill, a suburb of Bathurst.

History
Construction of Ben Chifley Dam started in 1948 and was completed eight years later. It was officially opened by the Premier of New South Wales, Joseph Cahill on 10 November 1956. The dam then succeeded Winburndale Dam as the potable-water supply for Bathurst. Winburndale Dam had been built in 1934 with an expected life of 20 years.  Since completion of Ben Chifley Dam, Winburndale has been used to supply raw water for park watering and industrial use.

Plans to upgrade the Ben Chifley Dam commenced in 1989 after it was realised it did not meet the New South Wales Dam Safety Committee's safety recommendations and could fail in the event of a severe flood. An evacuation plan was implemented downstream.

Construction to upgrade the dam started in 1999.

Gallery

See also

 List of dams and reservoirs in New South Wales
 Winburndale Dam

References

External links
 

Bathurst, New South Wales
Embankment dams
Dams completed in 1956
Central West (New South Wales)
Dams in New South Wales